Hazrat Jandaha, also commonly called Jandaha. It is a town in Vaishali district, Bihar state, India.

Location
Situated near the National Highway 322,  it lies near the  border with Samastipur District. It is around 30 km east of Hajipur and lies near Jandaha.

Patna Airport is the nearest airport. Shahpur Patoree Railway Station in Samastipur District is the nearest railhead.

Transport

Rail link
Nearest Railway stations: 

 Hajipur - 30km 
 Patori
 Muzaffarpur
 Samastipur
Airport
Patna Airport - 55 km.

Roads
Jandaha is connected to other parts of India through national and state highways. The major highways are:

National Highway 322 (NH 322) which starts from Hajipur and joins NH 28A at Musri Gharari (Samastipur).

Direction Board

References

External links
 chowk-Jandaha-76946.htm About kargil chowk Jandaha
 chowk-jandaha/ Satellite image of kargil chowk Jandaha

Cities and towns in Vaishali district